The men's 4 × 400 metres relay at the 2008 IAAF World Indoor Championships took place on March 9, 2008.

Medalists

Results

Heats
Qualification: First 2 of each heat (Q) plus the 2 fastest times (q) advance to the final.

Final 
The final was started at 19:06 on March 9.

References

4 × 400 metres relay at the World Athletics Indoor Championships
Relay men